The New Hope School is a historic schoolhouse at 3762 Arkansas Highway 284, east of Wynne, Arkansas.  It is a single-story wood-frame structure with simple Plain-Traditional style, which was built in stages.  In 1903 a single-room schoolhouse was built to serve the students of District 25, to which a second classroom was added sometime before 1930, resulting in the building's present appearance.  This building was used as a school until 1951, after which it was purchased by a local peach farmer for use in his business.  In 2007 the building was donated to the Cross County Historical Society, which has overseen its restoration.

The building was listed on the National Register of Historic Places in 2008.

It was a one-room schoolhouse before it was a two-room schoolhouse.

See also

National Register of Historic Places listings in Cross County, Arkansas

References

School buildings on the National Register of Historic Places in Arkansas
One-room schoolhouses in Arkansas
Two-room schoolhouses
School buildings completed in 1903
Buildings and structures in Cross County, Arkansas
National Register of Historic Places in Cross County, Arkansas
1903 establishments in Arkansas